Anchieta College is a private Catholic primary and secondary school located in Nova Friburgo, in the state of Rio de Janeiro, Brazil. It is named for the 16th century Jesuit missionary José de Anchieta.

In 2006, the college took 17th place nationally, 6th in the state, and 1st in Nova Friburgo in the National High School Examination (ESMS).

History
Anchieta College was founded in April 1886 by Jesuit priests and brothers from the Roman Province. It is currently a part of the Central-Eastern Brazil Province of the Society of Jesus.

The College opened in a large farm house on Burn Hill, known among Swiss settlers as "The Chateau," a name still applied to it by many in the city. It began as a boarding school for students from all over Brazil.

See also
 List of Jesuit sites

References

Jesuit schools in Brazil
Catholic primary schools in Brazil
Educational institutions established in 1886
Catholic secondary schools in Brazil
1886 establishments in Brazil